Duane Straugheir (born 28 September 1989), also known by the nickname of "Straff", is an English professional rugby league footballer who plays for Rochdale Hornets in Betfred League 1.

Background
Straugheir was born in England.

Career
Straugheir was in the Bradford Bulls Academy system and also worked for Bradford Bulls as a community development officer. He made his début for the Featherstone Rovers whilst on loan from Bradford Bulls in 2010.

He has also previously played 18 times for the York City Knights. After this, he was signed for the Sheffield Eagles, and in a 5-year spell went on to play a total of 153 games, scoring 43 tries.

Having been released by the Eagles at the end of the 2017 season, 'Straff' joined Hunslet for the 2018 League 1 season. He was made Hunslet rugby league football club captain in the 2018 League 1.

References

External links
Hunslet profile
Sheffield Eagles profile
York City Knights profile
Scoresway profile

1989 births
Living people
Bradford Bulls players
English rugby league players
Featherstone Rovers players
Hunslet R.L.F.C. captains
Hunslet R.L.F.C. players
Rochdale Hornets captains
Rochdale Hornets players
Rugby league centres
Rugby league second-rows
Sheffield Eagles players
York City Knights players